Electotreta is an extinct genus of firefly  closely resembling Ototretinae from the Eocene Epoch. It was described by Sergey V. Kazantsev in 2012, and the type species is Electotreta rasnitsyni. It was found within Baltic amber.

References

Eocene insects
Lampyridae genera
Prehistoric beetle genera
Prehistoric insects of Europe
Fossil taxa described in 2012